Seaman Andrew Brinn (born 1829) was a Scottish sailor who fought in the American Civil War. Brinn received the country's highest award for bravery during combat, the Medal of Honor, for his action aboard the USS Mississippi at Port Hudson on 14 March 1863. He was honored with the award on 10 July 1863.

Medal of Honor citation

See also

List of American Civil War Medal of Honor recipients: A–F

References

1829 births
Scottish-born Medal of Honor recipients
People of New York (state) in the American Civil War
Union Navy officers
United States Navy Medal of Honor recipients
American Civil War recipients of the Medal of Honor
Year of death missing